Bishopstown Stadium is an association football stadium located in Bishopstown on the western outskirts of Cork, Ireland. It is the home ground of Women's National League (WNL) club Cork City WFC. Formerly the home ground of League of Ireland club Cork City FC, it later became their training ground.

Cork City FC's move to Bishopstown in 1993 proved costly and unpopular with fans, while the condition of the pitch quickly became "notorious". With Cork City on the verge of liquidation in November 1995, the Football Association of Ireland (FAI) bought the stadium for £70,000 to be shared amongst the club's creditors. Under new ownership Cork City returned to Turners Cross in 1996.

Property speculators McCarthy Developments then bought the Bishopstown ground and twice tried to turn it into student accommodation serving the Cork Institute of Technology, only to be refused planning permission. They rented the site back to Cork City as a training ground and administrative base in early 2010. Cork Women's FC began using the facility as their home ground in 2013, as they forged closer links with the owners of the male Cork City club.

References

Cork City F.C.
Association football venues in the Republic of Ireland
Association football venues in Cork (city)
Cork City W.F.C.
1992 establishments in Ireland
Sports venues completed in 1992